Guy Hascoët (born February 29, 1960 in Le Mans, Sarthe) is a French politician and a member of The Greens-Europe Écologie.

He was a major negotiator in the deal between the Greens and the PS which gave the Green Marie-Christine Blandin the presidency of the Nord-Pas-de-Calais region in 1992.

In the 1997 election, he became deputy for the Nord and became Secretary of State for the solidary economy in the Lionel Jospin cabinet in 2000. He later became a close ally of Lionel Jospin within the Greens, many of whom had grown uneasy with Jospin - notably Dominique Voynet.

In 2009, he was selected to be the leader of The Greens-Europe Écologie's list in Brittany for the 2010 regional elections. With 17,37% of the votes in the second term, he's elected in the regional council of Brittany

References

1960 births
Living people
French politicians
People from Le Mans
French people of Breton descent